Captain & Tennille were American recording artists whose primary success occurred in the 1970s. The husband-and-wife team were "Captain" Daryl Dragon (1942–2019) and Toni Tennille (born 1940). They have five albums certified gold or platinum and scored numerous hits on the US singles charts, the most enduring of which included "Love Will Keep Us Together", "Do That to Me One More Time", and "Muskrat Love." They  hosted their own television variety series on ABC in 1976–77.

Early history and collaboration
In 1972, Toni Tennille was the co-writer of an ecology-themed musical, Mother Earth. At that time, Daryl Dragon (son of composer Carmen Dragon) was working as a keyboardist for the Beach Boys, where thanks to his habit of wearing a ship captain's hat while performing he got his stage name "Captain". When Tennille's show was preparing to move from San Francisco's Marines Memorial Theatre to Southern California's South Coast Repertory, a call was put out for a replacement keyboardist. Dragon was between tours when he heard about the opening, met Tennille in San Francisco to audition, and landed the gig.

Dragon later reciprocated by recommending Tennille to the Beach Boys when the band needed an additional keyboardist, and they hired her. She toured with them for a year, and has since been known as the Beach Boys' one and only "Beach Girl."

Realizing their collaborative potential when the tour was over, Tennille and Dragon began performing as a duo at the Smokehouse Restaurant in Encino, California. They started to become popular in the Los Angeles area, and their early version of the Tennille-penned "The Way I Want to Touch You" became popular on a local radio station. This led to a recording contract with A&M Records.

Their first hit single, a rendition of Neil Sedaka and Howard Greenfield's "Love Will Keep Us Together", reached #1 on the Billboard Hot 100 singles chart nine weeks after its 1975 debut, and went on to win the Grammy Award for Record of the Year. It sold over 1 million copies and was awarded a Gold disc by the RIAA on July 1, 1975. Tennille paid tribute to Sedaka in the recording when she sang the overdub "Sedaka's back" at the outro. The duo successfully mined the Sedaka songbook a number of times over their chartmaking career. Two of their other hit singles were the Sedaka co-writes "Lonely Night (Angel Face)" and "You Never Done It Like That". Their Spanish recording of "Love Will Keep Us Together", "Por Amor Viviremos", also charted in 1975; it was the first time two versions of the same single charted simultaneously. Tennille and Dragon included renditions of several other Sedaka songs on their albums.

Tennille and Dragon married on November 11, 1975. A wedding date of Valentine's Day 1974 had long been erroneously reported (on their show, Tennille claimed they were married on Valentine's Day), such as on the February 14, 1976, edition of Casey Kasem's American Top 40.

Success and subsequent period

Over the next few years, Captain & Tennille released a string of hit singles mostly from their first two albums Love Will Keep Us Together (US #2, 1975) and Song Of Joy (US #9, 1976) including "The Way I Want to Touch You" (US #4), "Lonely Night (Angel Face)" (US #3), "Shop Around" (US #4), and "Muskrat Love" (US #4).

In July 1976, they were invited by First Lady Betty Ford to perform in the East Room of the White House in the presence of Queen Elizabeth II and President Gerald Ford during the country's bicentennial celebration.

Such was the level of their popularity that they were given their own television variety show. The Captain and Tennille TV show aired from September 1976 to March 1977 on ABC. It featured musical numbers and comedy sketches performed with various guest stars. However, despite solid ratings success, the duo wanted to focus on their music and touring career and, after one season, asked to be released from their contract.

The duo's third album Come in from the Rain (US #18, 1977) produced three singles: "Can't Stop Dancing" (US #13), the title track (US #61), and "Circles", which did not chart. A&M Records later released a Greatest Hits album (1977) which peaked at #55 on the US Top 200.

The duo released their fourth studio album Dream (US #131, 1978), although their first single "I'm on My Way" (US #74) failed to become a hit. However, their second single, and third Sedaka title, "You Never Done It Like That," fared much better at #10. A third single was "You Need a Woman Tonight" (US #40). Dream would be the last Captain and Tennille studio album released by A&M.

In 1979, Neil Bogart signed them to a contract on his Casablanca Records label. The album Make Your Move (US #23, 1979) rose much higher on the chart than the act's previous release, and the first single "Do That to Me One More Time" reached the summit on February 16, 1980, becoming their second #1 single. However, subsequent singles "Love on a Shoestring" (US #55) and "Happy Together (A Fantasy)" (US #53) only achieved minimal success.

Keeping Our Love Warm (1980) was the duo's second Casablanca release, and sixth studio album overall, but failed to crack the Top 200. The first single from this album, the title track, was performed live (although lip synced) during the 1980 Macy's Thanksgiving Day Parade.

During the duo's period of highest popularity, Tennille also worked as a session singer (most frequently partnered with the Beach Boys' Bruce Johnston), performing as a backing vocalist on the Elton John albums Caribou, Blue Moves, and 21 at 33 (some vocally arranged by Dragon) and most notably on the hit track "Don't Let the Sun Go Down on Me". She also appeared as a backing vocalist on tracks by Art Garfunkel and the Beach Boys, as well as Pink Floyd for whom she performed backing tracks on The Wall album.

In the liner notes of the Captain & Tennille anthology Ultimate Collection: The Complete Hits, Tennille explains how her work on Pink Floyd's album gained her at least one new fan:

Following a December 1979 pilot, from September 1980 to February 1981 Tennille hosted her own syndicated television talk show, The Toni Tennille Show.

1990s–2019

Throughout the 1990s, they continued to perform various concert dates at venues around the world, frequently at Harrah's Lake Tahoe and Harrah's Reno, which were located close to their home near Carson City, Nevada. One of their more notable appearances in that decade occurred when they played at the House of Blues on the Sunset Strip in Los Angeles in 1995, as part of their 20th anniversary as an act.

At the same time throughout the 1980s and 1990s, Tennille enjoyed a second career as a big band and pop standard singer, similar to pop colleague Linda Ronstadt. She performed with orchestras throughout the country and subsequently recorded several solo albums including Mirage Records' More Than You Know (1984), and All of Me on Gaia Records in 1987.

In 1999, on Cartoon Network, the duo made a guest appearance, interviewed by Harvey Birdman, rather than Space Ghost (who is sent to jail and breaks out) in an episode of Space Ghost Coast to Coast.

Toni Tennille also enjoyed a year as the star of the Broadway tour of Victor/Victoria. At the end of that project, she and Dragon were to have embarked on a 25th anniversary tour; however, the stresses of the road proved too demanding and Captain & Tennille instead put an indefinite hold on their career as a performing duo. Nevertheless, Captain & Tennille's popularity remained evident in the release of their Ultimate Collection: The Complete Hits on Hip-O Records (a subsidiary of Universal Records) in 2001, and More Than Dancing... Much More, a 2002 compact disc. The latter contains what was originally their final album in 1982, More Than Dancing, which at that time was released only in Australia, and is combined with selected tracks from their 1995 20 Years of Romance, originally on K-Tel (re-recording of their songs, and cover versions of others), as well as five newly released tracks.

In November 2003, Tennille performed a benefit concert for the Reno, Nevada Chamber Orchestra, where her surprise guest was Dragon. It was the first time they had publicly performed as Captain & Tennille in many years. Their first live recording, An Intimate Evening with Toni Tennille, was released to commemorate the event.

In 2005, Brant Berry, the vice president of a small Portland, Oregon–based entertainment company, Respond 2 Entertainment (R2), signed an agreement with Captain & Tennille to release three projects. The first was the home video release of Captain & Tennille's 1976 variety series, on a three-disc DVD set containing 11 complete episodes with bonus musical tracks. Second, R2 re-released all six of their albums, both from the original A&M and Casablanca labels, on newly remastered CDs. Several of the CDs were previously available only in Japan. The new CDs, packaged both as individual CDs and in a box set, contained new liner notes written by Tennille.

Third, a new recording by Captain & Tennille was released—a three-song Christmas CD entitled Saving Up Christmas. This effort was followed by The Secret of Christmas released on Captain & Tennille's own label, Purebred Records, on November 1, 2006. It was Captain & Tennille's first complete original album produced in more than a decade, and their first-ever Christmas album.

Tennille returned to the UK airwaves and to club play when the band Bent sampled a small portion of her vocals from Captain & Tennille's 1979 track, "Love on a Shoestring" (from the album Make Your Move), into their "Magic Love" single in 2003. An Ashley Beedle remix of the single heightened the danceability of the original ambient track.

In October 2006, Cartoon Network's animated special Casper's Scare School was aired. The duo recorded two songs for the film, and voiced the dialog for the characters who sang the songs. Tennille portrayed Aunt Belle and the Captain was Uncle Murray, who together formed a two-head-on-one-body being known as the Ankle. The two songs they performed, "Why Does Love Make Me Feel So Good" and "World Without Fear," were written by Magnus Fiennes. Captain & Tennille's co-stars on the show included Phyllis Diller, James Belushi, Dan Castellaneta, and Bob Saget.

In 2007, three new DVDs were released of Captain & Tennille's ABC TV specials: Captain & Tennille in Hawaii, Captain & Tennille in New Orleans, and Captain & Tennille Songbook.

Dragon and Tennille spent most of the 1990s and 2000s living in the Carson City area of Nevada, where they had lived for more than fifteen years, and where Tennille served as Ambassador for the Arts for the state. In the mid-2000s, they temporarily took year-round residence at their second home, located in the Palm Springs area of Southern California. In 2008, they sold their home near Carson City, and built a house in Prescott, Arizona, where Tennille participates in the annual Prescott Jazz Summit.

Divorce
Tennille filed for divorce from Dragon in the State of Arizona on January 16, 2014, after 39 years of marriage. Dragon was unaware of the termination of his marriage until he was served with the divorce papers. The divorce documents referenced health insurance or health issues, and Tennille had written in her blog in 2010 that Dragon's neurological condition, known as essential tremor, was characterized by such extreme tremors that he could no longer play keyboards. Dragon later stated that some of his health problems were the result of errors in dosing his medication.

In 2016, Toni Tennille, Tennille's memoir (co-written with niece Caroline Tennille St. Clair), was published. In it, Tennille painted an unflattering picture of Dragon and their years together, writing that he was controlling and emotionally distant. "I can say without exaggeration that he showed no physical affection for me during our very long marriage," she wrote, claiming that the couple always slept in separate bedrooms.

Dragon's death
Dragon and Tennille remained close friends until his death from complications of kidney failure on January 2, 2019, in Prescott, Arizona. Tennille was at his side when he died.

Discography

Studio albums

Compilation albums
Source:

Singles

DVDs
The Ultimate Collection (2005)
The Christmas Show (2007)
Captain & Tennille in New Orleans (2007)
Captain & Tennille in Hawaii (2007)
Songbook (2007)

See also 

 1976–77 United States network television schedule
 Captain & Tennille singles discography

Notes

References

External links
 Official site
 Toni Tennille's site
 1975 singles
 
 Toni Tennille returns to her Southern roots  – Montgomery Advertiser, April, 2016.

1972 establishments in California
2013 disestablishments in California
A&M Records artists
American pop music groups
American soft rock music groups
Grammy Award winners
Married couples
American musical duos
Male–female musical duos
Soft rock duos
Casablanca Records artists
Musical groups established in 1972
Musical groups disestablished in 2013